Jocelyn Andrea Peterman (born September 23, 1993) is a Canadian curler. She currently plays second for the Kaitlyn Lawes rink.

Career

Juniors
Peterman and her team of Brittany Tran, Becca Konschuh and Kristine Anderson won a silver medal skipping Alberta at the 2011 Canada Winter Games, losing to British Columbia's Corryn Brown in the final. The next season, the team represented Alberta at the 2012 Canadian Junior Curling Championships. They won the event, defeating Manitoba's Shannon Birchard rink in the national final. This qualified the team to represent Canada at the 2012 World Junior Curling Championships. After posting a 6–3 round robin record, the team lost to Russia's Anna Sidorova in a tie-breaker match, thus failing to make the playoffs. In 2013, her rink failed to even make the Canadian Juniors, having not even made the playoffs in the Alberta playdowns. In 2014, her last year of junior eligibility, Peterman's team lost in the Alberta junior final to Kelsey Rocque, who would go on to win that year's World Junior championships.

During her junior career, the Peterman team entered several World Curling Tour, including the Curlers Corner Autumn Gold Curling Classic twice, which was a Grand Slam event at the time. She would win just one match at the 2012 Curlers Corner Autumn Gold Curling Classic and was winless at the 2013 Curlers Corner Autumn Gold Curling Classic.

Women's
After juniors, Peterman joined the Heather Nedohin team in 2014 as their alternate, later becoming their second. On the World Curling Tour that season, the team entered four slams, making the playoffs in three. Their best result was a semi-final finish at the Canadian Open. They also played in the 2014 Canada Cup of Curling, finishing in third place. The team played in the 2015 Alberta Scotties Tournament of Hearts, the first provincial championship appearance for Peterman. There, the rink made it to the semi-final, where they lost to Chelsea Carey.

Nedohin retired from curling in 2015, and Chelsea Carey would take over the team as skip, with Peterman becoming the full-time second, replacing Jessica Mair. The team would fail to qualify for either Slam they entered that season. They did however win the 2016 Alberta Scotties Tournament of Hearts, defeating Edmonton's Val Sweeting in the final.  The win sent Peterman to her first ever national women's championship, the 2016 Scotties Tournament of Hearts.  At this event, her team of Carey, Amy Nixon, Laine Peters, alternate Susan O'Connor and coach Charley Thomas went 9–2 in the round robin, clinching the first place seed in the playoffs. The team defeated Jennifer Jones of Team Canada in the 1-vs-2 game and then Northern Ontario's Krista McCarville in the final. Peterman represented Canada at the 2016 Ford World Women's Curling Championship, in Swift Current, where the team went on to finish in fourth place.

Early in the 2016-17 curling season, the Carey rink played in the 2016 Canada Cup of Curling and finished with a 2–4 record. Later in the year, the Carey rink represented Team Canada (as defending champions) at the 2017 Scotties Tournament of Hearts, where they won a bronze medal.

Team Carey had a strong run at the 2017 Canadian Olympic Curling Trials, going undefeated until losing to the Rachel Homan rink in the final. The team continued on this roll into the new year, winning the 2018 Meridian Canadian Open. Their success stopped at the 2018 Alberta Scotties Tournament of Hearts, with the team losing both of their playoff games. They had a second chance at making that year's Scotties Tournament of Hearts, where they played Kerri Einarson in a wild-card game, but they would lose that event too. After the season, Peterman left the team, moving to Winnipeg to play for Jennifer Jones, replacing the retiring Jill Officer.

In her first season as a member of Team Jones, the team won the 2018 Canada Cup and the 2019 TSN All-Star Curling Skins Game, but failed to win any Grand Slam events. As Jones had won the 2018 Scotties Tournament of Hearts, the team represented Team Canada at the 2019 Scotties Tournament of Hearts. There the team failed to make the playoffs, finishing with a 6–5 record.

In their first event of the 2019-20 season, Team Jones won the 2019 AMJ Campbell Shorty Jenkins Classic, defeating Tracy Fleury in the final. Next they played in the 2019 Colonial Square Ladies Classic where Fleury would take them out in the semi-finals. They had two quarterfinal finishes at the first two Slams of the season, the Masters and the Tour Challenge. At the Canada Cup, the team struggled, finishing with a 2–4 record. The team made the final at the Boost National, losing to Team Hasselborg, and the quarterfinals at the Canadian Open. The team made the final of the 2020 Manitoba Scotties Tournament of Hearts and lost to Team Einarson. By virtue of their CTRS ranking, the team had a second chance to qualify for the 2020 Scotties Tournament of Hearts through the wild card play-in game, where they defeated Team Fleury to become Team Wild Card. At the Scotties, they finished the round robin and championship pool with a 9–2 record as the second seed in playoffs but lost to Kerri Einarson (Team Manitoba) in the 1 vs. 2 playoff game and to Rachel Homan (Team Ontario) in the semifinal to finish in third place. It would be their last event of the season as both the Players' Championship, and the Champions Cup Grand Slam events were also cancelled due to the COVID-19 pandemic. On March 18, 2020, the team announced that Lisa Weagle, after parting ways with Team Homan, would join the team in a 5-player rotation. Peterman curled 82% at the tournament and was named to the second all-star team as a result.

The Jones rink won their lone event of the abbreviated 2020–21 season at the 2020 Stu Sells Oakville Tankard. The 2021 Manitoba Scotties were cancelled due to the COVID-19 pandemic in Manitoba, so Curl Manitoba appointed the Jones rink to represent Manitoba at the 2021 Scotties Tournament of Hearts. At the 2021 Hearts, the team finished with a 9–3 record, putting them in a third place tiebreaker match against Alberta, skipped by Laura Walker. Alberta defeated Manitoba 9–8 to advance to the semifinal. Team Jones ended their season at the only two Grand Slam events of the abbreviated season, also held in the Calgary bubble. The team missed the playoffs at both the 2021 Champions Cup and the 2021 Players' Championship.

Team Jones qualified for the playoffs in each of their first four tour events, however, they were not able to qualify for any finals. At the first Grand Slam of the season, the 2021 Masters, the team was able to reach the final before losing to Tracy Fleury in a 9–7 match. They then missed the playoffs at the 2021 National two weeks later.

A month later, Team Jones competed in the 2021 Canadian Olympic Curling Trials. There, the team posted a 5–3 round robin record, earning a spot in the semifinal. They then defeated Krista McCarville to qualify for the final, where they would face Fleury again. After a tight game all the way through, Team Fleury stole one in the ninth end to take a single-point lead. In the tenth end, Jones had an open hit-and-stick to win the game; however, her shooter rolled too far, and she only got one. This sent the game to an extra end. On her final shot, Fleury attempted a soft-weight hit on a Jones stone partially buried behind a guard. Her rock, however, curled too much and hit the guard, giving up a steal of one and the game to Team Jones. After the game, Jones said that "We're there to pick each other up when you miss, not everybody can say that and that's really a big strength of our team." With the win, Team Jones travelled to Beijing, China to represent Canada at the 2022 Winter Olympics. Through the round robin, the Canadian team had mixed results, ultimately finishing tied for third with a 5–4 record. However, because of their draw shot challenge results, which were the lowest of the teams they were tied with, they ranked fifth overall, missing the playoffs.

On March 15, 2022, Team Jones announced they would be parting ways after the 2021–22 season. Peterman and third Kaitlyn Lawes then announced they would be joining Selena Njegovan and Kristin MacCuish of Team Fleury to form a new team for the 2022–23 season. Lawes would skip the team, with Njegovan playing third, Peterman at second and MacCuish at lead.

Team Jones still had two more events together before parting ways, the 2022 Players' Championship and 2022 Champions Cup Grand Slams. At the Players', the team went 1–3, missing the playoffs. They then missed the playoffs again at the Champions Cup with a 1–4 record, ending the team's run together.

Mixed doubles
In April 2016, Peterman and teammate Brett Gallant won the 2016 Canadian Mixed Doubles Curling Trials after battling to a 12–8 win over Laura Crocker and Geoff Walker at the Nutana Curling Club in Saskatoon, Sask. The new champions were playing in their first Mixed Doubles event together. The pair played in the 2018 Canadian Mixed Doubles Curling Olympic Trials, going undefeated in group play, but lost to the eventual champion John Morris / Kaitlyn Lawes pairing in the semifinal. Peterman and Gallant also won the 2019 Canadian Mixed Doubles Curling Championship, defeating Nancy Martin and Tyrel Griffith in the final. The pair represented Canada at the 2019 World Mixed Doubles Curling Championship, where they won the silver medal after losing 6–5 to Sweden's Anna Hasselborg and Oskar Eriksson on the last rock. The duo returned to defend their championship title at the 2021 Canadian Mixed Doubles Curling Championship, as the 2020 championship was cancelled due to the pandemic. After finishing 5–1 through the round robin, they lost to Kadriana Sahaidak and Colton Lott in the round of 8, eliminating them from contention.

On March 2, 2022, Curling Canada announced that Peterman and Gallant would represent Canada at the 2022 World Mixed Doubles Curling Championship after the Canadian Mixed Doubles Championship was cancelled due to COVID. At the championship, the pair finished second in their pool with an 8–1 record, only suffering one loss to Scotland's Eve Muirhead and Bobby Lammie. This earned them a spot in the qualification game against Norway's Maia and Magnus Ramsfjell. After a tight game all the way through, Norway scored two in the final end to win the game 6–5, eliminating the Canadians in fifth place.

On the World Curling Tour, Gallant and Peterman have won the 2018 Battleford Mixed Doubles Fall Curling Classic and the 2019 China Open.

Personal life
She was a competitive softball player, having competed at the 2013 Canada Summer Games. She is the daughter of Lowell and Nancy and began curling at age 5. Her brother, Joel Peterman, won Gold in curling at the 2007 Canada Winter Games and has won two Canada Summer Games silver medals in baseball. She is married to her doubles partner, Brett Gallant.  She graduated from the University of Calgary in 2015 with a Bachelor's degree in Kinesiology. She is currently studying at the Smith School of Business at Queen's University at Kingston.

She currently lives in Chestermere, Alberta.

Teams

References

External links

1993 births
Canadian women curlers
Living people
Sportspeople from Red Deer, Alberta
Curlers from Calgary
Canadian women's curling champions
Canadian mixed doubles curling champions
Continental Cup of Curling participants
Canadian softball players
Canada Cup (curling) participants
Curlers at the 2022 Winter Olympics
Olympic curlers of Canada
Queen's University at Kingston alumni
University of Calgary alumni